Kodar may refer to:

Kodar Mountains, a range in Siberia, Russia
Kodur-e Bala, a village in Iran

See also
Oja Kodar, a Croatian actress